Manuel Costas Bermúdez (born 13 September 1947) is a Spanish former professional footballer who played as a forward.

Career
Born in Moaña, Costas played for Celta Vigo, Racing de Ferrol and Hércules.

References

1947 births
Living people
Spanish footballers
RC Celta de Vigo players
Racing de Ferrol footballers
Hércules CF players
Segunda División players
Association football forwards
Footballers from Moaña